Almiro Edson Daniel Lobo, better known as Miró (born 30 April 1982 in Quelimane) is a Mozambican football defender who currently plays for South African Premier Soccer League club Platinum Stars and Mozambique.

International career

International goals
Scores and results list Mozambique's goal tally first.

References

External links
 

1982 births
Living people
People from Zambezia Province
Mozambican footballers
Mozambique international footballers
Association football defenders
C.D. Maxaquene players
Budapest Honvéd FC players
Bidvest Wits F.C. players
Platinum Stars F.C. players
Liga Desportiva de Maputo players
F.C. Bravos do Maquis players
Atlético Sport Aviação players
Nemzeti Bajnokság I players
South African Premier Division players
Girabola players
Mozambican expatriate footballers
Mozambican expatriate sportspeople in Hungary
Mozambican expatriate sportspeople in South Africa
Mozambican expatriate sportspeople in Angola
Expatriate footballers in Hungary
Expatriate soccer players in South Africa
Expatriate footballers in Angola
2010 Africa Cup of Nations players
Mozambique A' international footballers
2014 African Nations Championship players